Letňany is a metro station on Line C of the Prague Metro. It is located about one kilometre south of Letňany built-up area, on the border between Letňany and Vysočany, near a tripoint with Kbely, and it belongs to section IV.C2 of Line C, connecting Letňany with Ládví. The station was opened on 8 May 2008 as the northern end of the extension from Ládví and has served since then as the new terminus of the line.

Station characteristics 

Letňany Station is the terminal station of Line C. It is located at the junction of Beranových Street and Prosecká Street, at the south end of Tupolevova Street. The station is below street level, it has an island platform and two entrance halls, each of them connected to the platform by a staircase, two escalators and a lift. The north hall serves the Prague Exhibition Centre (PVA) and P+R parking lots; the south hall connects the station with a number of bus stops. There are eighteen bus lines of Prague Integrated Transport (PID).

The platform is  under ground. Its supporting structure is made from closed monolithic reinforced concrete (one large continuous block).

References

External links 

 Gallery and information 

Prague Metro stations
Railway stations opened in 2008
2008 establishments in the Czech Republic
Railway stations in the Czech Republic opened in the 21st century